The following is a list of episodes from the United Kingdom television series Creature Comforts and its American remake.

The series originally aired on ITV in the UK and is currently being repeated on Gold and SF2.

Original film (1989)

The series

Season 1 (2003)

Season 2 (2005-2006)

American version (2007)

External links

Creature Comforts
Creature Comforts episodes, List of